"Sexual Harassment" is the second episode of the second season of the American comedy television series The Office, and the show's eighth episode overall. The episode was written by B. J. Novak and directed by Ken Kwapis. The episode first aired in the United States on September 27, 2005, on NBC. "Sexual Harassment" saw the first physical appearance of recurring character Todd Packer (played by David Koechner) after first being heard through a phone call in the first episode.

The series depicts the everyday lives of office employees in the Scranton, Pennsylvania, branch of the fictional Dunder Mifflin Paper Company. In this episode, Michael Scott (Steve Carell) is concerned when he believes Dunder Mifflin is targeting him for sexual harassment training. Meanwhile, Pam Beesly (Jenna Fischer) anxiously awaits the arrival of her mother, and Michael's obnoxious friend Todd Packer (David Koechner) spends the day in the office.

Novak was inspired to write the episode after attending an NBC sexual harassment seminar that the cast and crew had to attend before the series began. Many jokes and personal experiences involving sexual harassment were added into the script. This episode aired with a warning that it contained adult content and subject matter, which is rare for a network comedy. Novak explained that he had to fight NBC to get the word "boner" on the air. (Nevertheless, many stations censored the word, and one station refused to air the episode altogether.) "Sexual Harassment" received moderately positive reviews from television critics. The episode was viewed by 7.13 million viewers.

Plot
Michael Scott's (Steve Carell) "best friend forever" Todd Packer (David Koechner) offends the staff with crude gossip about an upper management scandal. Toby Flenderson (Paul Lieberstein) informs Michael that he will conduct a review of the company's sexual harassment policies because the CFO resigned after allegations made by his secretary.  Michael's indignation that this will put a damper on his easygoing office environment rises to outrage when he learns that the corporate headquarters is sending down a lawyer to talk to him. Michael and the warehouse staff mock the sexual harassment video, but the crude remarks come to a screeching halt when Jan Levinson (Melora Hardin) and the lawyer arrive from Corporate.

While Michael angrily announces that he can no longer be friends with his staff and that he will never tell another joke again, Jim Halpert (John Krasinski) goads Michael into breaking his vow immediately, to the approval of Packer. Michael's attitude suddenly changes when he realizes that he is not in trouble, and that the lawyer's job is to protect him. After Packer tells a crude joke at the expense of Phyllis, Michael defends her, telling the entire office that he finds Phyllis attractive and that the only thing he worries about when he is near her "is getting a boner".

Meanwhile, Pam Beesly (Jenna Fischer) waits with anticipation for her mother (Shannon Cochran) to arrive from out of town. Pam's mother arrives and asks in whispers (shushed by an embarrassed Pam), "Which one is Jim?" Michael stops Packer when he tries to share another inappropriate joke and concludes with his misguided thoughts on sexual harassment.

Production

"Sexual Harassment" was written by B. J. Novak, who also acts on the show as Ryan Howard. The episode was the third entry of the series directed by Ken Kwapis. Kwapis had previously directed "Pilot" and "Diversity Day". The inspiration for the episode was the NBC sexual harassment seminar that the cast and crew had to attend before the series began. Having both worked in office environments prior to filming The Office, Jenna Fischer and Angela Kinsey both noted that on the days of sexual harassment seminars, they would be harassed by their co-workers as a joke. This experience was added to the script for the episode. "Sexual Harassment" introduces Michael's catchphrase "That's what she said," which writer B. J. Novak says was something he heard repeated in college. The "What has two thumbs and X? This guy" joke also comes from Novak's college days. Jenna Fischer later revealed that a good majority of Dwight's exchange with Toby about female anatomy was improvised.

When it came time to cast Todd Packer, the crew's first choice was David Koechner, who had starred alongside Carell in the hit 2004 comedy movie Anchorman: The Legend of Ron Burgundy. Production for the episode had to be delayed so that Koechner could be secured for the part. Novak noted that Koechner was one of the few actors who was "talented enough to make Steve Carell break up on set", a feat that he notes was "worth" the delays.

When deciding what car Packer would own, writer B. J. Novak wanted to use a Mustang, but none were available. Producer Kent Zbornak decided to get Packer a red Chevrolet Corvette, which Novak now admits is "even better". This episode aired with a warning that it contained adult content and subject matter, which is rare for a network comedy. Novak explained that he had to fight NBC to get the word "boner" on the air because the replacement—"schwing"—did not have, according to Novak, "the same redemption for Michael at the end." The disclaimer was a compromise. A station in Kentucky nevertheless refused to air this episode. Pam's mother was played by Shannon Cochran in this episode of the series, in the first appearance of the character at this point in the show. Cochran was unable to return to play the character for the season six episode "Niagara", due to scheduling conflicts with a year-long theater contract, and was thus replaced by Linda Purl.

Cultural references
Michael forwards Jim a joke chain-email entitled "Fifty Signs Your Priest Might Be Michael Jackson". Michael later compares the members of the office to the cast of Friends, saying that he is both Chandler Bing and Joey Tribbiani and Pam is Rachel Green. He claims that Dwight is Cosmo Kramer, failing to realize that he is a character in the sitcom Seinfeld and not Friends. Todd Packer's license plate reads "WLHUNG", a reference to a large penis, but Ryan interprets it to mean he is a fan of singer William Hung. Darryl asks whether Michael got his pants at "Queers R Us", a reference to Toys R Us. The episode is the first to feature what would become Michael's catchphrase: "That's what she said."

Reception
"Sexual Harassment" originally aired on NBC in the United States on September 27, 2005. The episode was viewed by 7.13 million viewers. The episode ranked as the sixty-third most-watched episode of television for the week it aired. An encore presentation of the episode, on May 31, 2006, received 2.2 rating/6% share and retained 100% of its lead-in viewership from My Name is Earl among 18- to 49-year-olds. The encore presentation was viewed by over 4.5 million viewers.

"Sexual Harassment" received moderately positive reviews from critics. Michael Sciannamea of TV Squad wrote that the episode "was OK, nothing great." Sciannamea went on to explain that the "subject was funny, but I thought the writers were trying too hard to push the envelope", making the episode "uneven". "Miss Alli" of Television Without Pity gave the episode a "B+" grade. Erik Adams of The A.V. Club awarded the episode a "B−" and called it "a slightly above average episode", but that its greatest success was an ability to reach "some of its greatest heights on a moment-by-moment basis", similar in style to vignettes. Adams was slightly critical of the main plot, noting that the show had "difficulty maintaining the comedic momentum", but he reasoned that this was probably largely due to "Michael-on-defense" being a "difficult character to write", because "there aren’t many good ways of displaying his humanity while he’s also fighting for the right to be an asshole."

TV Fanatic reviewed several quotes from "Sexual Harassment", and rated several of Todd Packer's lewd jokes, as well as Michael's "You wouldn't arrest a guy who was just passing drugs from one guy to another" monologue 5 out of 5. Entertainment Weekly named Michael Scott's line, "Toby is in HR, which technically means he works for corporate. So he's really not a part of our family. Also, he's divorced, so he's really not a part of his family," one of "TV's funniest lines" for the week ending October 3, 2005. Dan Phillips from IGN named "Michael's Boner" the tenth most awkward moment of the show, noting that, "The camera holds the others' reactions just long enough to drive home the awkwardness of the scene, making you want to crawl inside of a hole along with the rest of the cast."

References

External links
"Sexual Harassment" at NBC.com

The Office (American season 2) episodes
2005 American television episodes